1st Intelligence Battalion may refer to:

1st Intelligence Battalion (Australia), an Australian Army unit
1st Intelligence Battalion (United States), a United States Marine Corps unit